Mr. Deeds is a 2002 American comedy film directed by Steven Brill, written by Tim Herlihy, and starring Adam Sandler and Winona Ryder with Peter Gallagher, Jared Harris, Allen Covert, Erick Avari, and John Turturro in supporting roles. It was a remake of the 1936 Frank Capra film Mr. Deeds Goes to Town, which itself was based on the 1935 short story Opera Hat by Clarence Budington Kelland.

Plot
Multi-billionaire Preston Blake freezes to death upon reaching the top of Mount Everest. With no immediate heir, it is unclear who will inherit Blake's massive fortune. His board of directors discover that he has a living grandnephew named Longfellow Deeds, who runs a pizzeria in Mandrake Falls, New Hampshire, and also writes greeting cards. Deeds is flown to New York City by businessman Chuck Cedar, who temporarily controls Blake Media. Once Deeds arrives, plans are made for him to sell his shares in the company to Cedar and return home with $40 billion. Deeds remains in New York while the legal details are worked out.

The story is major news and reporter Babe Bennett, who works for a tabloid television show called Inside Access, wants in on the inside story. She has co-worker Marty pretend to steal her purse in sight of Deeds, who "rescues" Babe. She then goes out with him pretending to be "Pam Dawson", a school nurse from Iowa. Though Babe initially just wanted a career-advancing story, she eventually falls for the unfailingly soft-hearted Deeds. During a dinner date at Madison Square Garden,  Inside Access, in concert with Cedar, reveals Pam's true identity to Deeds. Heartbroken, Deeds decides to return home to Mandrake Falls with assurances that the company will stay open in Blake's honor, and he donates his $40 billion to the United Negro College Fund.

After returning to Mandrake Falls, Deeds learns from his friend Crazy Eyes that Cedar intends to sell the company, causing thousands of employees to lose their jobs. Babe follows Deeds to Mandrake Falls to win him back. After saving her life when she falls through the ice over a lake, he rejects her, saying he does not really know who she is.

At a shareholders' meeting, Cedar has persuaded everyone to sell the company until Deeds, who has bought a single share, arrives and convinces everyone not to sell. However, Cedar controls a majority of the shares and the sale is approved. Babe arrives after having studied Blake's stolen diary and has determined Blake's longtime butler Emilio Lopez is actually his illegitimate son and the true heir as a result of an affair with his maid. Emilio immediately takes control of Blake Media and fires Cedar. Babe reconciles with Deeds after professing she loves him. Emilio thanks Deeds for his support and gives him a billion dollars.

Deeds spends some of his money on red Corvettes for everyone in Mandrake Falls, and returns to the pizzeria with Babe.

Cast
 Adam Sandler as Longfellow Deeds, Preston Blake's great nephew, a friendly, helpful owner of a small-town pizzeria who also writes greeting cards who inherited a billion-dollar empire from his late great uncle.
 Winona Ryder as Babe Bennett, a reporter for the tabloid television show Inside Access, who disguises herself as Pam Dawson, a school nurse, to get close to and gather information on Deeds.
 Peter Gallagher as Chuck Cedar, the CEO for Blake Media and Preston Blake's longtime number two who plots to seize control of Blake Media so he can make a huge profit selling it.
 Jared Harris as Mac McGrath, the dishonest Australian head of Inside Access who reports on Deeds' antics in New York, often misrepresenting Deeds in a negative light.
 Allen Covert as Marty, a junior reporter for Inside Access, infatuated with and a cohort of Babe, appearing in several disguises to spy on Deeds.
 Erick Avari as Cecil Anderson, the general counsel for Blake Media.
 John Turturro as Emilio Lopez, Preston Blake's long-serving butler and illegitimate son (therefore Deeds' long-lost cousin and the true heir to Blake Media). He has a habit of sneaking up on people unexpectedly and he also has a foot fetish which also explains why Preston does not let him change his socks.
 Peter Dante as Murph, one of Deeds' friends who works at his pizzeria.
 Conchata Ferrell as Jan, a close friend of Deeds who works in the pizzeria and is a retired rodeo clown.
 Harve Presnell as Preston Blake, the billionaire founder and Chairman of Blake Media who freezes to death at the top of Mount Everest.
 Steve Buscemi as Crazy Eyes, a citizen of Mandrake Falls and one of Deeds' customers who suffers from severe amblyopia.
 Brandon Molale as Kevin Ward, the New York Jets quarterback.
 Blake Clark as Buddy Ward, Kevin Ward's father.
 John McEnroe as himself
 Craig Castaldo though he also goes by Craig Schwartz but is best known as Radio Man as himself, a fictional version of him who is a homeless man living in Central Park.
 Jennifer Tisdale as a Card Reader
 Al Sharpton as himself, he presides over Preston Blake's funeral.
 J.B. Smoove as Reuben
 Walter Williamson as Kurt, a singer at the Metropolitan Opera.
 Roark Critchlow as William
 Billy St. John as George
 George Wallace as a UNCF administrator
 Alfred Dennis as Old Timer
 Aloma Wright as Coretta Keeling
 Nancy Arsenault as French investor
 Barbara Arsenault as French investor
 Rob Schneider as Nazo (uncredited), a food delivery man who was previously seen in Big Daddy and appears in two brief scenes.

Production
The producers were looking for a small, "old-fashioned, New England-type" town close to New York, when they serendipitously discovered New Milford, Connecticut, and, upon having lunch there at "The Bistro Cafe", decided the town would be the perfect choice to portray the fictional home-town of Deeds, Mandrake Falls, New Hampshire, and the cafe was a great location to use as "'Deeds' Pizza" restaurant. Some scenes were also shot in Carmel, New York. Several sequences were filmed in New York City around Spring 2001. Following the September 11th, 2001 attacks, images of the World Trade Center towers were digitally removed from several shots of New York City. The Blake Media Hotel scenes were shot in Beverly Hills, California. The scene where Longfellow Deeds and Chuck Cedar are playing tennis at the tennis court was filmed at Roosevelt Island, New York.

Reception

Critical response
Mr. Deeds received mainly negative reviews from critics. On Rotten Tomatoes, the film has an approval rating of 22% based on reviews from 153 critics, with an average rating score of 4.20/10. Its consensus states: "This update of Capra doesn't hold a candle to the original, and even on its own merits, Mr. Deeds is still indifferently acted and stale."

Mr. Deeds received three Razzie Award nominations including Worst Actor (Adam Sandler), Worst Actress (Winona Ryder) and Worst Remake or Sequel. However, the film also won a Kids' Choice Award for Favorite Movie Actor (Sandler).

Audiences polled by CinemaScore gave the film an average grade of "A−" on an A+ to F scale.

Box office
Though critically panned, the film was a major financial success. Box office:

 United States: US$126,293,452
 International: US$44,976,083
 Gross worldwide: US$171,269,535

Music

Soundtrack

References

External links

 
 
 

2002 films
2002 romantic comedy films
Remakes of American films
American romantic comedy films
Comedy crossover films
Cultural depictions of John McEnroe
2000s English-language films
Films about inheritances
Films based on short fiction
Films directed by Steven Brill
Films produced by Jack Giarraputo
Films scored by Teddy Castellucci
Films about the upper class
Films set in New Hampshire
Films set in New York City
Films shot in Connecticut
Films shot in New York (state)
Films shot in New York City
Films with screenplays by Tim Herlihy
Happy Madison Productions films
Impact of the September 11 attacks on cinema
New Line Cinema films
Columbia Pictures films
2000s American films